Design-oriented programming is a way to author computer applications using a combination of text, graphics, and style elements in a unified code-space. The goal is to improve the experience of program writing for software developers, boost accessibility, and reduce eye-strain. Good design helps computer programmers to quickly locate sections of code using visual cues typically found in documents and web page authoring.

User interface design and graphical user interface builder research are the conceptual precursors to design-oriented programming languages. The former focus on the software experience for end users of the software application and separate editing of the user interface from the code-space. The important distinction is that design-oriented programming involves user experience of programmers themselves and fully merges all elements into a single unified code-space.

See also 
 User interface design
 Graphical user interface builder
 Elements of graphical user interfaces
 Visual programming language
 Experience design
 User experience design
 Usability

References 
 Visual programming
 Intro to Design-Oriented Programming Languages

Computer programming